Vanja Stanković (born 24 March 1998) is a Serbian taekwondo practitioner. She won a gold medal in the women's flyweight event at the 2017 World Taekwondo Championships.

Born in Belgrade and a member of TK Galeb, she also won gold medals at the European U21 Taekwondo Championships in Bulgaria and the Belgian Open in the months preceding her win at the world championships. In 2019, she won the US Open G2 category event in Las Vegas.

Stanković won a bronze medal at the 2018 Mediterranean Games and also competed in the women's 49 kg event at the 2022 Mediterranean Games held in Oran, Algeria. She won her first match and was then eliminated by eventual gold medalist Merve Dinçel of Turkey.

References

1998 births
Living people
Sportspeople from Belgrade
Serbian female taekwondo practitioners
Mediterranean Games bronze medalists for Serbia
Mediterranean Games medalists in taekwondo
Competitors at the 2018 Mediterranean Games
Competitors at the 2022 Mediterranean Games
World Taekwondo Championships medalists
21st-century Serbian women